List of 20th-century American writers is an excerpt from a list of 20th century American writes, sorted by birth year.

1946

1950

1952

1951

1952

1953

1954

1956

1962

1963

See also
 List of 20th-century writers
 Literature in the 1970s
 Literature in the 1980s
 Literature in the 1990s
 Literature in the 2000s

References

 

Lists of American writers
Lists of 20th-century people